Tilkiler Cave, a.k.a. Tilkiler Sinkhole, ( a.k.a. Tilkiler Düdeni) is a cave located in Manavgat district of Antalya in southern Turkey. It is named after the nearby village Tilkiler.

Tilkiler Cave was discovered in 1976 during the preparatory construction works at Oymapınar Dam while excavating an injection gallery. It is the country's third longest one.

The cave was constituted in the Miocene conglomerate rock formation. It is also partly formed in limestone. These characteristics make it valuable for scientific research. The ponds inside the cave are at different elevations. The cave floods in springtime. A few kilometers from the entrance, there is a hall, where the ground is completely covered with sand. In 1977, French speleologists built four small sand castles there that gave the hall the name "Hall of Castles". It was observed 27 years later that the sand castles were still intact.

References

Caves of Turkey
Caves of Antalya Province
Manavgat District
Wild caves